Milkwood may refer to:

Plant species or genera 
 Alstonia, a widespread genus of evergreen trees and shrubs from the dogbane family Apocynaceae
 Lobelia scaevolifolia, an endemic lobelioid from the island of St Helena
 Sideroxylon inerme, or white milkwood of southern Africa, a member of the Sapotaceae
 Tabernaemontana, a pan-tropical genus of 100-110 species of flowering plants in the family Apocynaceae

Music 
 Milkwood (band), Anglo-Canadian rock band formed in 1969

See also   
 Under Milk Wood, a 1954 radio drama